The Val Gardena Railway or Klausen-Plan (Grödnertalbahn in German) was a  narrow gauge railway operating in the Val Gardena in the Dolomites of northern Italy. It was constructed in 1915/6 when the region was part of the Austrian Empire. Construction was remarkably rapid: begun in September 1915, the line was completed and opened on 6 February 1916. This feat was accomplished by the conscripted labour of some 6,000 Russian prisoners of war. It closed on 28 May 1960. A 3.5km long section between Santa Cristina Val Gardena and Ortisei is now a public footpath, the Val Gardena Railway Trail.

Locomotive no. R 410.004 (FS numbering) is preserved adjacent to the Railway Trail at Ortisei. It is an outside cylinder 0-8-0 well tank with outside frames which was built in 1916 by Krauss of Linz (works number 7174) as no. 4154 Class IVc for the KUK Heeresbahn (Austro-Hungarian Military Railways). It was one of seven similar locomotives which worked on the line.

For route map and other data concerning line see https://www.wikidata.org/wiki/Q634597.

References 

760 mm gauge railways in Italy
Railway lines in Trentino-Alto Adige/Südtirol